Galba (fl. mid-1st century BC) was a king (rex) of the Suessiones, a Celtic polity of Belgic Gaul, during the Gallic Wars. When Julius Caesar entered the part of Gaul that was still independent of Roman rule in 58 BC, a number of Belgic polities formed a defensive alliance and acclaimed Galba commander-in-chief. Caesar recognizes Galba for his sense of justice (iustitia) and intelligence (prudentia).

Etymology of name
Galba as a Roman cognomen is associated with a branch of the gens Sulpicia. Although the most famous bearer is the Emperor Galba in the 1st century AD, a Servius Sulpicius Galba also served under Caesar in Gaul. Suetonius says that in Gaulish Galba means "fat" (compare Old Irish golb, "paunchy, fat"), and Galba is usually regarded as Celtic in origin. Since physical fitness was a requirement of Gallic fighting men, who might be fined if they reported for duty overweight, the Celtic name is likely either to have lost the connotations of its original meaning, or in regard to a king to refer to "fat times" or prosperity.

References

1st-century BC rulers in Europe
Gaulish rulers
Barbarian people of the Gallic Wars